In mathematics, a topological space X is sequentially compact if every sequence of points in X has a convergent subsequence converging to a point in .
 
Every metric space is naturally a topological space, and for metric spaces, the notions of compactness and sequential compactness are equivalent (if one assumes countable choice). However, there exist sequentially compact topological spaces that are not compact, and compact topological spaces that are not sequentially compact.

Examples and properties 

If a space is a metric space, then it is sequentially compact if and only if it is compact. The first uncountable ordinal with the order topology is an example of a sequentially compact topological space that is not compact. The product of  copies of the closed unit interval is an example of a compact space that is not sequentially compact.

Related notions 
In a metric space, the notions of sequential compactness, limit point compactness, countable compactness and compactness are all equivalent (if one assumes the axiom of choice).

In a sequential (Hausdorff) space sequential compactness is equivalent to countable compactness.

There is also a notion of a one-point sequential compactification—the idea is that the non convergent sequences should all converge to the extra point.

See also

Notes

References

 
 Steen, Lynn A. and Seebach, J. Arthur Jr.; Counterexamples in Topology, Holt, Rinehart and Winston (1970). .

Compactness (mathematics)
Properties of topological spaces